Lidia Djunita Pamontjak or better known as Jajang C. Noer (born June 28, 1952 in Paris, France) is a France-born Indonesian actress and film producer of Minangkabau descent. She is also the only daughter of Indonesian national independence movement figure, Nazir Datuk Pamoentjak.

Filmography

Awards and nominations

Miscellaneous
 Her father as Indonesian activist in Dutch colonial era, Nazir Datuk Pamoentjak

External links
 
 
  Profil Jajang C.Noer Kapanlagi.com

1952 births
Living people
Indo people
Indonesian film actresses
Indonesian film producers
Minangkabau people
Indonesian people of Dutch descent
Maya Award winners
Citra Award winners